Sir Humphry Davy, 1st Baronet,  (17 December 177829 May 1829) was a British chemist and inventor who invented the Davy lamp and a very early form of arc lamp. He is also remembered for isolating, by using electricity, several elements for the first time: potassium and sodium in 1807 and calcium, strontium, barium, magnesium and boron the following year, as well as for discovering the elemental nature of chlorine and iodine. Davy also studied the forces involved in these separations, inventing the new field of electrochemistry. Davy is also credited to have been the first to discover clathrate hydrates in his lab.

In 1799 he experimented with nitrous oxide and was astonished at how it made him laugh, so he nicknamed it "laughing gas" and wrote about its potential anaesthetic properties in relieving pain during surgery.

Davy was a baronet, President of the Royal Society (PRS), Member of the Royal Irish Academy (MRIA), Fellow of the Geological Society (FGS), and a member of the American Philosophical Society (elected 1810). Berzelius called Davy's 1806 Bakerian Lecture On Some Chemical Agencies of Electricity "one of the best memoirs which has ever enriched the theory of chemistry."

Early life: 1778–1798

Education, apprenticeship and poetry
Davy was born in Penzance, Cornwall, in the Kingdom of Great Britain on 17 December 1778, the eldest of the five children of Robert Davy, a woodcarver, and his wife Grace Millett. According to his brother and fellow chemist John Davy, their hometown was characterised by "an almost unbounded credulity respecting the supernatural and monstrous ... Amongst the middle and higher classes, there was little taste for literature, and still less for science ... Hunting, shooting, wrestling, cockfighting, generally ending in drunkenness, were what they most delighted in." 

At the age of six, Davy was sent to the grammar school at Penzance. Three years later, his family moved to Varfell, near Ludgvan, and subsequently, in term-time Davy boarded with John Tonkin, his godfather and later his guardian. Upon Davy's leaving grammar school in 1793, Tonkin paid for him to attend Truro Grammar School to finish his education under the Rev Dr Cardew, who, in a letter to Davies Gilbert, said dryly, "I could not discern the faculties by which he was afterwards so much distinguished." Davy entertained his school friends by writing poetry, composing Valentines, and telling stories from One Thousand and One Nights. Reflecting on his school days in a letter to his mother, Davy wrote, "Learning naturally is a true pleasure; how unfortunate then it is that in most schools it is made a pain." "I consider it fortunate", he continued, "I was left much to myself as a child, and put upon no particular plan of study ... What I am I made myself." His brother, moreover, claimed Davy possessed a "native vigour" and "the genuine quality of genius, or of that power of intellect which exalts its possessor above the crowd."

After Davy's father died in 1794, Tonkin apprenticed him to John Bingham Borlase, a surgeon with a practice in Penzance. While becoming a chemist in the apothecary's dispensary, he began conducting his earliest experiments at home, much to the annoyance of his friends and family. His older sister, for instance, complained his corrosive substances were destroying her dresses, and at least one friend thought it likely the "incorrigible" Davy would eventually "blow us all into the air." 

In 1797, after he learned French from a refuge priest, Davy read Lavoisier's Traité élémentaire de chimie. This exposure influenced much of his future work, which can be seen as reaction against Lavoisier's work and the dominance of French chemists.

As a poet, over one hundred and sixty manuscript poems were written by Davy, the majority of which are found in his personal notebooks. Most of his written poems were not published, and he chose instead to share a few of them with his friends. Eight of his known poems were published. His poems reflected his views on both his career and also his perception of certain aspects of human life. He wrote on human endeavours and aspects of life like death, metaphysics, geology, natural theology and chemistry.

John Ayrton Paris remarked that poems written by the young Davy "bear the stamp of lofty genius". Davy's first preserved poem entitled The Sons of Genius is dated 1795 and marked by the usual immaturity  of youth. Other poems written in the following years, especially On the Mount's Bay and St Michael's Mount, are descriptive verses. 

Three of Davy's paintings from around 1796 have been donated to the Penlee House museum at Penzance. One is of the view from above Gulval showing the church, Mount's Bay and the Mount, while the other two depict Loch Lomond in Scotland.

At 17, he discussed the question of the materiality of heat with his Quaker friend and mentor Robert Dunkin. Dunkin remarked: 'I tell thee what, Humphry, thou art the most quibbling hand at a dispute I ever met with in my life.' One winter day he took Davy to the Larigan River, To show him that rubbing two plates of ice together developed sufficient energy by motion, to melt them, and that after the motion was suspended, the pieces were united by regelation. It was a crude form of analogous experiment exhibited by Davy in the lecture-room of the Royal Institution that elicited considerable attention. As professor at the Royal Institution, Davy repeated many of the ingenious experiments he learned from his friend and mentor, Robert Dunkin.

Although he initially started writing his poems, albeit haphazardly, as a reflection of his views on his career and on life generally, most of his final poems concentrated on immortality and death. This was after he started experiencing failing health and a decline both in health and career.

Early Career: 1798–1802

Scientific Interests
Davies Giddy met Davy in Penzance carelessly swinging on the half-gate of Dr Borlase's house, and interested by his talk invited him to his house at Tredrea and offered him the use of his library. This led to his introduction to Dr Edwards, who lived at Hayle Copper House. Edwards was a lecturer in chemistry in the school of St. Bartholomew's Hospital. He permitted Davy to use his laboratory and possibly directed his attention to the floodgates of the port of Hayle, which were rapidly decaying as a result of the contact between copper and iron under the influence of seawater. Galvanic corrosion was not understood at that time, but the phenomenon prepared Davy's mind for subsequent experiments on ships' copper sheathing. Gregory Watt, son of James Watt, visited Penzance for his health's sake, and while lodging at the Davys' house became a friend and gave him instructions in chemistry. Davy was acquainted with the Wedgwood family, who spent a winter at Penzance.

Thomas Beddoes and John Hailstone were engaged in a geological controversy on the rival merits of the Plutonian and Neptunist hypotheses. They travelled together to examine the Cornish coast accompanied by Davies Gilbert and made Davy's acquaintance. Beddoes, who had established at Bristol a 'Pneumatic Institution,' needed an assistant to superintend the laboratory. Gilbert recommended Davy, and in 1798 Gregory Watt showed Beddoes the Young man's Researches on Heat and Light, which were subsequently published by him in the first volume of West-Country Contributions. After prolonged negotiations, mainly by Gilbert, Mrs Davy and Borlase consented to Davy's departure, but Tonkin wished him to remain in his native town as a surgeon, and altered his will when he found that Davy insisted on going to Dr Beddoes.

In 1802, Humphry Davy had what was then the most powerful electrical battery in the world at the Royal Institution. With it, Davy created the first incandescent light by passing electric current through a thin strip of platinum, chosen because the metal had an extremely high melting point. It was neither sufficiently bright nor long lasting enough to be of practical use, but demonstrated the principle. By 1806 he was able to demonstrate a much more powerful form of electric lighting to the Royal Society in London. It was an early form of arc light which produced its illumination from an electric arc created between two charcoal rods.

Pneumatic Institution

On 2 October 1798, Davy joined the Pneumatic Institution at Bristol. It had been established to investigate the medical powers of factitious airs and gases (gases produced experimentally or artificially), and Davy was to superintend the various experiments. The arrangement agreed between Dr Beddoes and Davy was generous, and enabled Davy to give up all claims on his paternal property in favour of his mother. He did not intend to abandon the medical profession and was determined to study and graduate at Edinburgh, but he soon began to fill parts of the institution with voltaic batteries. While living in Bristol, Davy met the Earl of Durham, who was a resident in the institution for his health, and became close friends with Gregory Watt, James Watt, Samuel Taylor Coleridge and Robert Southey, all of whom became regular users of nitrous oxide (laughing gas). The gas was first synthesised in 1772 by the natural philosopher and chemist Joseph Priestley, who called it phlogisticated nitrous air (see phlogiston). Priestley described his discovery in the book Experiments and Observations on Different Kinds of Air (1775), in which he described how to produce the preparation of "nitrous air diminished", by heating iron filings dampened with nitric acid.

James Watt built a portable gas chamber to facilitate Davy's experiments with the inhalation of nitrous oxide. At one point the gas  was combined with wine to judge its efficacy as a cure for hangover (his laboratory notebook indicated success). The gas was popular among Davy's friends and acquaintances, and he noted that it might be useful for performing surgical operations. Anesthetics were not regularly used in medicine or dentistry until decades after Davy's death.

Davy threw himself energetically into the work of the laboratory and formed a long romantic friendship with Mrs Anna Beddoes, the novelist Maria Edgeworth's sister, who acted as his guide on walks and other fine sights of the locality. The critic Maurice Hindle was the first to reveal that Davy and Anna had written poems for each other. Wahida Amin has transcribed and discussed a number of poems written between 1803 and 1808 to "Anna" and one to her infant child. In December 1799 Davy visited London for the first time and extended his circle of friends. Davy features in the diary of William Godwin, with their first meeting recorded for 4 December 1799.

In the gas experiments Davy ran considerable risks. His respiration of nitric oxide which may have combined with air in the mouth to form nitric acid (HNO3), severely injured the mucous membrane, and in Davy's attempt to inhale four quarts of "pure hydrocarbonate" gas in an experiment with carbon monoxide he "seemed sinking into annihilation." On being removed into the open air, Davy faintly articulated, "I do not think I shall die," but some hours elapsed before the painful symptoms ceased. Davy was able to take his own pulse as he staggered out of the laboratory and into the garden, and he described it in his notes as "threadlike and beating with excessive quickness".

In this year the first volume of the West-Country Collections was issued. Half consisted of Davy's essays On Heat, Light, and the Combinations of Light, On Phos-oxygen and its Combinations, and on the Theory of Respiration. On 22 February 1799 Davy, wrote to Davies Gilbert, "I am now as much convinced of the non-existence of caloric as I am of the existence of light." In another letter to Gilbert, on 10 April, Davy informs him: "I made a discovery yesterday which proves how necessary it is to repeat experiments. The gaseous oxide of azote (the laughing gas) is perfectly respirable when pure. It is never deleterious but when it contains nitrous gas. I have found a mode of making it pure." He said that he breathed sixteen quarts of it for nearly seven minutes, and that it "absolutely intoxicated me." 
Davy became increasingly well known in 1799 due to his experiments with the physiological action of some gases, including laughing gas (nitrous oxide). In addition to himself, his enthusiastic experimental subjects included his poet friends Robert Southey and Samuel Taylor Coleridge.

During 1799, Beddoes and Davy published Contributions to physical and medical knowledge, principally from the west of England and Essays on heat, light, and the combinations of light, with a new theory of respiration. On the generation of oxygen gas, and the causes of the colors of organic beings. Their experimental work was poor, and the publications were harshly criticised. In after years Davy regretted he had ever published these immature hypotheses, which he subsequently designated "the dreams of misemployed genius which the light of experiment and observation has never conducted to truth."

These criticisms, however, led Davy to refine and improve his experimental techniques, spending his later time at the institution increasingly in experimentation.
In 1800, Davy informed Gilbert that he had been "repeating the galvanic experiments with success" in the intervals of the experiments on the gases, which "almost incessantly occupied him from January to April." In 1800, Davy published his Researches, Chemical and Philosophical, chiefly concerning Nitrous Oxide and its Respiration, and received a more positive response.

William Wordsworth and Samuel Taylor Coleridge moved to the Lake District in 1800, and asked Davy to deal with the Bristol publishers of the Lyrical Ballads, Biggs & Cottle. Coleridge asked Davy to proofread the second edition, the first to contain Wordsworth's "Preface to the Lyrical Ballads", in a letter dated 16 July 1800: "Will you be so kind as just to look over the sheets of the lyrical Ballads". Wordsworth subsequently wrote to Davy on 29 July 1800, sending him the first manuscript sheet of poems and asking him specifically to correct: "any thing you find amiss in the punctuation a business at which I am ashamed to say I am no adept". Wordsworth was ill in the autumn of 1800 and slow in sending poems for the second edition; the volume appeared on 26 January 1801 even though it was dated 1800. While it is impossible to know whether Davy was at fault, this edition of the Lyrical Ballads contained many errors, including the poem "Michael" being left incomplete. In a personal notebook marked on the front cover "Clifton 1800 From August to Novr", Davy wrote his own Lyrical Ballad: "As I was walking up the street". Wordsworth features in Davy's poem as the recorder of ordinary lives in the line: "By poet Wordsworths Rymes" [sic].

Royal Institution
In 1799, Count Rumford had proposed the establishment in London of an 'Institution for Diffusing Knowledge', i.e. the Royal Institution. The house in Albemarle Street was bought in April 1799. Rumford became secretary to the institution, and Dr Thomas Garnett was the first lecturer.

In February 1801 Davy was interviewed by the committee of the Royal Institution, comprising Joseph Banks, Benjamin Thompson (who had been appointed Count Rumford) and Henry Cavendish. Davy wrote to Davies Gilbert on 8 March 1801 about the offers made by Banks and Thompson, a possible move to London and the promise of funding for his work in galvanism. He also mentioned that he might not be collaborating further with Beddoes on therapeutic gases. The next day Davy left Bristol to take up his new post at the Royal Institution, it having been resolved 'that Humphry Davy be engaged in the service of the Royal Institution in the capacity of assistant lecturer in chemistry, director of the chemical laboratory, and assistant editor of the journals of the institution, and that he be allowed to occupy a room in the house, and be furnished with coals and candles, and that he be paid a salary of 100l. per annum.'

On 25 April 1801, Davy gave his first lecture on the relatively new subject of 'Galvanism'. He and his friend Coleridge had had many conversations about the nature of human knowledge and progress, and Davy's lectures gave his audience a vision of human civilisation brought forward by scientific discovery. "It [science] has bestowed on him powers which may almost be called creative; which have enabled him to modify and change the beings surrounding him, and by his experiments to interrogate nature with power, not simply as a scholar, passive and seeking only to understand her operations, but rather as a master, active with his own instruments." The first lecture garnered rave reviews, and by the June lecture Davy wrote to John King that his last lecture had attendance of nearly 500 people. "There was Respiration, Nitrous Oxide, and unbounded Applause. Amen!"
Davy revelled in his public status.

Davy's lectures included spectacular and sometimes dangerous chemical demonstrations along with scientific information, and were presented with considerable showmanship by the young and handsome man. 
Davy also included both poetic and religious commentary in his lectures, emphasizing that God's design was revealed by chemical investigations.   Religious commentary was in part an attempt to appeal to women in his audiences. Davy, like many of his enlightenment contemporaries, supported female education and women's involvement in scientific pursuits, even proposing that women be admitted to evening events at the Royal Society.
Davy acquired a large female following around London. In a satirical cartoon by Gillray, nearly half of the attendees pictured are female. His support of women caused Davy to be subjected to considerable gossip and innuendo, and to be criticised as unmanly.

When Davy's lecture series on Galvanism ended, he progressed to a new series on Agricultural Chemistry, and his popularity continued to skyrocket. By June 1802, after just over a year at the Institution and at the age of 23, Davy was nominated to full lecturer at the Royal Institution of Great Britain. Garnett quietly resigned, citing health reasons.

In November 1804 Davy became a Fellow of the Royal Society, over which he would later preside. He was one of the founding members of the Geological Society in 1807 and was elected a foreign member of the Royal Swedish Academy of Sciences in 1810 and a Foreign Honorary Member of the American Academy of Arts and Sciences in 1822.

Mid-Career: 1802–1820

Photographic Enlargements  
In June 1802 Davy published in the first issue of the Journals of the Royal Institution of Great Britain his An Account of a Method of Copying Paintings upon Glass, and of Making Profiles, by the Agency of Light upon Nitrate of Silver. Invented by T. Wedgwood, Esq. With Observations by H. Davy in which he described their experiments with the photosensitivity of silver nitrate. 

He recorded that "images of small objects, produced by means of the solar microscope, may be copied without difficulty on prepared paper." Josef Maria Eder, in his History of Photography, though crediting Wedgwood, because of his application of this quality of silver nitrate to the making of images, as "the first photographer in the world," proposes that it was Davy who realised the idea of photographic enlargement using a solar microscope to project images onto sensitised paper. Neither found a means of fixing their images, and Davy devoted no more of his time to furthering these early discoveries in photography. 

The principle of image projection using solar illumination was applied to the construction of the earliest form of photographic enlarger, the "solar camera".

Elements

Davy was a pioneer in the field of electrolysis using the voltaic pile to split common compounds and thus prepare many new elements. He went on to electrolyse molten salts and discovered several new metals, including sodium and potassium, highly reactive elements known as the alkali metals. Davy discovered potassium in 1807, deriving it from caustic potash (KOH). Before the 19th century, no distinction had been made between potassium and sodium. Potassium was the first metal that was isolated by electrolysis. Davy isolated sodium in the same year by passing an electric current through molten sodium hydroxide.

During the first half of 1808, Davy conducted a series of further electrolysis experiments on alkaline earths including lime, magnesia, strontites and barytes. At the beginning of June, Davy received a letter from the Swedish chemist Berzelius claiming that he, in conjunction with Dr. Pontin, had successfully obtained amalgams of calcium and barium by electrolysing lime and barytes using a mercury cathode. Davy managed to successfully repeat these experiments almost immediately and expanded Berzelius' method to strontites and magnesia. He noted that while these amalgams oxidised in only a few minutes when exposed to air they could be preserved for lengthy periods of time when submerged in naphtha before becoming covered with a white crust.
On 30 June 1808 Davy reported to the Royal Society that he had successfully isolated four new metals which he named barium, calcium, strontium and magnium (later changed to magnesium) which were subsequently published in the Philosophical Transactions. Although Davy conceded magnium was an "undoubtedly objectionable" name he argued the more appropriate name magnesium was already being applied to metallic manganese and wished to avoid creating an equivocal term.
The observations gathered from these experiments also led to Davy isolating boron in 1809.

Chlorine was discovered in 1774 by Swedish chemist Carl Wilhelm Scheele, who called it "dephlogisticated marine acid" (see phlogiston theory) and mistakenly thought it contained oxygen. Davy showed that the acid of Scheele's substance, called at the time oxymuriatic acid, contained no oxygen. This discovery overturned Lavoisier's definition of acids as compounds of oxygen. In 1810, chlorine was given its current name by Humphry Davy, who insisted that chlorine was in fact an element. The name chlorine, chosen by Davy for "one of [the substance's] obvious and characteristic properties – its colour", comes from the Greek χλωρος (chlōros), meaning green-yellow.

Laboratory Incident 
Davy seriously injured himself in a laboratory accident with nitrogen trichloride. French chemist Pierre Louis Dulong had first prepared this compound in 1811, and had lost two fingers and an eye in two separate explosions with it. In a letter to John Children, on 16 November 1812, Davy wrote: "It must be used with great caution. It is not safe to experiment upon a globule larger than a pin's head. I have been severely wounded by a piece scarcely bigger. My sight, however, I am informed, will not be injured". Davy's accident induced him to hire Michael Faraday as a co-worker, particularly for assistance with handwriting and record keeping. He had recovered from his injuries by April 1813.

Travels

European Tour

In 1812, Davy was knighted and gave up his lecturing position at the Royal Institution. He was given the title of Honorary Professor of Chemistry. He gave a farewell lecture to the Institution, and married a wealthy widow, Jane Apreece. (While Davy was generally acknowledged as being faithful to his wife, their relationship was stormy, and in later years he travelled to continental Europe alone.)

Davy then published his Elements of Chemical Philosophy, part 1, volume 1, though other parts of this title were never completed. He made notes for a second edition, but it was never required. 
In October 1813, he and his wife, accompanied by Michael Faraday as his scientific assistant (also treated as a valet), travelled to France to collect the second edition of the prix du Galvanisme, a medal that Napoleon Bonaparte had awarded Davy for his electro-chemical work. Faraday noted "Tis indeed a strange venture at this time, to trust ourselves in a foreign and hostile country, where so little regard is had to protestations of honour, that the slightest suspicion would be sufficient to separate us for ever from England, and perhaps from life". Davy's party sailed from Plymouth to Morlaix by cartel, where they were searched.

Upon reaching Paris, Davy was a guest of honour at a meeting of the First Class of the Institut de France and met with André-Marie Ampère and other French chemists. It was later reported that Davy's wife had thrown the medal onto the sea, near her Cornish home, "as it raised bad memories". The Royal Society of Chemistry has offered over £1,800 for the recovery of the medal.

While in Paris, Davy attended lectures at the Ecole Polytechnique, including those by Joseph Louis Gay-Lussac on a mysterious substance isolated by Bernard Courtois. Davy wrote a paper for the Royal Society on the element, which is now called iodine. This led to a dispute between Davy and Gay-Lussac on who had the priority on the research.

Davy's party did not meet Napoleon in person, but they did visit the Empress Joséphine de Beauharnais at the Château de Malmaison. The party left Paris in December 1813, travelling south to Italy. They sojourned in Florence, where using the burning glass of the Grand Duke of Tuscany  in a series of experiments conducted with Faraday's assistance, Davy succeeded in using the sun's rays to ignite diamond, proving it is composed of pure carbon.

Davy's party continued to Rome, where he undertook experiments on iodine and chlorine and on the colours used in ancient paintings. This was the first chemical research on the pigments used by artists.

He also visited Naples and Mount Vesuvius, where he collected samples of crystals. By June 1814, they were in Milan, where they met Alessandro Volta, and then continued north to Geneva. They returned to Italy via Munich and Innsbruck, and when their plans to travel to Greece and Istanbul were abandoned after Napoleon's escape from Elba, they returned to England.

After the Battle of Waterloo, Davy wrote to Lord Liverpool urging that the French be treated with severity:

Davy lamp

After his return to England in 1815, Davy began experimenting with lamps that could be used safely in coal mines. The Revd Dr Robert Gray of Bishopwearmouth in Sunderland, founder of the Society for Preventing Accidents in Coalmines, had written to Davy suggesting that he might use his 'extensive stores of chemical knowledge' to address the issue of mining explosions caused by firedamp, or methane mixed with oxygen, which was often ignited by the open flames of the lamps then used by miners. Incidents such as the Felling mine disaster of 1812 near Newcastle, in which 92 men were killed, not only caused great loss of life among miners but also meant that their widows and children had to be supported by the public purse. The Revd Gray and a fellow clergyman also working in a north-east mining area, the Revd John Hodgson of Jarrow, were keen that action should be taken to improve underground lighting and especially the lamps used by miners.

Davy conceived of using an iron gauze to enclose a lamp's flame, and so prevent the methane burning inside the lamp from passing out to the general atmosphere. Although the idea of the safety lamp had already been demonstrated by William Reid Clanny and by the then unknown (but later very famous) engineer George Stephenson, Davy's use of wire gauze to prevent the spread of flame was used by many other inventors in their later designs. George Stephenson's lamp was very popular in the north-east coalfields, and used the same principle of preventing the flame reaching the general atmosphere, but by different means. Unfortunately, although the new design of gauze lamp initially did seem to offer protection, it gave much less light, and quickly deteriorated in the wet conditions of most pits. Rusting of the gauze quickly made the lamp unsafe, and the number of deaths from firedamp explosions rose yet further.

There was some discussion as to whether Davy had discovered the principles behind his lamp without the help of the work of Smithson Tennant, but it was generally agreed that the work of both men had been independent. Davy refused to patent the lamp, and its invention led to his being awarded the Rumford medal in 1816.

Acid Studies 
In 1815 Davy also suggested that acids were substances that contained replaceable hydrogen ions;– hydrogen that could be partly or totally replaced by reactive metals which are placed above hydrogen in the reactivity series. When acids reacted with metals they formed salts and hydrogen gas. Bases were substances that reacted with acids to form salts and water. These definitions worked well for most of the nineteenth century.

Herculaneum papyri

Humphry Davy experimented on fragments of the Herculaneum papyri before his departure to Naples in 1818. His early experiments showed hope of success. In his report to the Royal Society Davy writes that: 
'When a fragment of a brown MS. in which the layers were strongly adhered, was placed in an atmosphere of chlorine, there was an immediate action, the papyrus smoked and became yellow, and the letters appeared much more distinct; and by the application of heat the layers separated from each other, giving fumes of muriatic acid.'

The success of the early trials prompted Davy to travel to Naples to conduct further research on the Herculaneum papyri. Accompanied by his wife, they set off on 26 May 1818 to stay in Flanders where Davy was invited by the coal miners to speak. They then traveled to Carniola (now Slovenia) which proved to become 'his favourite Alpine retreat' before finally arriving in Italy. In Italy, they befriended Lord Byron in Rome and then went on to travel to Naples.

Initial experiments were again promising and his work resulted in 'partially unrolling 23 MSS., from which fragments of writing were obtained'  but after returning to Naples on 1 December 1819 from a summer in the Alps, Davy complained that 'the Italians at the museum [were] no longer helpful but obstructive'. Davy decided to renounce further work on the papyri because 'the labour, in itself difficult and unpleasant, been made more so, by the conduct of the persons at the head of this department in the Museum'.

Later life: 1820–1829

Protection of Ship's bottoms
From 1761 onwards, copper plating had been fitted to the undersides of Royal Navy ships to protect the wood from attack by shipworms. However, the copper bottoms were gradually corroded by exposure to the salt water. Between 1823 and 1825, Davy, assisted by Michael Faraday, attempted to protect the copper by electrochemical means. He attached to the copper sacrificial pieces of zinc or iron , which provided cathodic protection to the host metal. It was discovered, however, that protected copper became foul quickly, i.e. pieces of weed and/or marine creatures became attached to the hull, which had a detrimental effect on the handling of the ship.
 
The Navy Board approached Davy in 1823, asking for help with the corrosion. Davy conducted a number of tests in Portsmouth Dockyard, which led to the Navy Board adopting the use of Davy's "protectors". By 1824, it had become apparent that fouling of the copper bottoms was occurring on the majority of protected ships. By the end of 1825, the Admiralty ordered the Navy Board to cease fitting the protectors to sea-going ships, and to remove those that had already been fitted. Davy's scheme was seen as a public failure, despite success of the corrosion protection as such.  As Frank A. J. L. James explains, "[Because] the poisonous salts from [corroding] copper were no longer entering the water, there was nothing to kill the barnacles and the like in the vicinity of a ship. This meant that barnacles [and the like] could now attach themselves to the bottom of a vessel, thus impeding severely its steerage, much to the anger of the captains who wrote to the Admiralty to complain about Davy's protectors."

President of the Royal Society
Elections took place on St Andrew's Day and Davy was elected on 30 November 1820. Although he was unopposed, other candidates had received initial backing. These candidates embodied the factional difficulties that beset Davy's presidency and which eventually defeated him.

The Society was in transition from a club for gentlemen interested in natural philosophy, connected with the political and social elite, to an academy representing increasingly specialised sciences. The previous president, Joseph Banks, had held the post for over 40 years and had presided autocratically over what David Philip Miller calls the "Banksian Learned Empire", in which natural history was prominent.

Banks had groomed the engineer, author and politician Davies Gilbert to succeed him and preserve the status quo, but Gilbert declined to stand. Fellows who thought royal patronage was important proposed Prince Leopold of Saxe-Coburg (later Leopold I of Belgium), who also withdrew, as did the Whig Edward St Maur, 11th Duke of Somerset. Davy was the outstanding scientist but some fellows did not approve of his popularising work at the Royal Institution.

The strongest alternative had been William Hyde Wollaston, who was supported by the "Cambridge Network" of outstanding mathematicians such as Charles Babbage and John Herschel, who tried to block Davy. They were aware that Davy supported some modernisation, but thought that he would not sufficiently encourage aspiring young mathematicians, astronomers and geologists, who were beginning to form specialist societies. Davy was only 41, and reformers were fearful of another long presidency.

In his early years Davy was optimistic about reconciling the reformers and the Banksians. In his first speech as president he declared, "I trust that, with these new societies, we shall always preserve the most amicable relations ... I am sure there is no desire in [the Royal Society] to exert anything like patriarchal authority in relation to these institutions".

Davy spent much time juggling the factions but, as his reputation declined in the light of failures such as his research into copper-bottomed ships, he lost popularity and authority. This was compounded by a number of political errors. In 1825 his promotion of the new Zoological Society, of which he was a founding fellow, courted the landed gentry and alienated expert zoologists. He offended the mathematicians and reformers by failing to ensure that Babbage received one of the new Royal Medals (a project of his) or the vacant secretaryship of the Society in 1826. In November 1826 the mathematician Edward Ryan recorded that: "The Society, every member almost ... are in the greatest rage at the President's proceedings and nothing is now talked of but removing him."

In the event he was again re-elected unopposed, but he was now visibly unwell. In January 1827 he set off to Italy for reasons of his health. It did not improve and, as the 1827 election loomed, it was clear that he would not stand again. He was succeeded by Davies Gilbert.

Final years

In 1818, Davy was awarded a baronetcy. Although Sir Francis Bacon (also later made a peer) and Sir Isaac Newton had already been knighted, this was, at the time, the first such honour ever conferred on a man of science in Britain. This was followed a year later with the Presidency of the Royal Society.

Davy's laboratory assistant, Michael Faraday, went on to enhance Davy's work and would become the more famous and influential scientist. Davy is supposed to have even claimed Faraday as his greatest discovery. Davy later accused Faraday of plagiarism, however, causing Faraday (the first Fullerian Professor of Chemistry) to cease all research in electromagnetism until his mentor's death.

According to one of Davy's biographers, June Z. Fullmer, he was a deist.

Of a sanguine, somewhat irritable temperament, Davy displayed characteristic enthusiasm and energy in all his pursuits. As is shown by his verses and sometimes by his prose, his mind was highly imaginative; the poet Coleridge declared that if he "had not been the first chemist, he would have been the first poet of his age", and Southey said that "he had all the elements of a poet; he only wanted the art." In spite of his ungainly exterior and peculiar manner, his happy gifts of exposition and illustration won him extraordinary popularity as a lecturer, his experiments were ingenious and rapidly performed, and Coleridge went to hear him "to increase his stock of metaphors." The dominating ambition of his life was to achieve fame; occasional petty jealousy did not diminish his concern for the "cause of humanity", to use a phrase often employed by him in connection with his invention of the miners' lamp. Careless about etiquette, his frankness sometimes exposed him to annoyances  he might have avoided by the exercise of tact.

In 1826 he suffered a stroke from which he never fully recovered. He spent the last months of his life writing Consolations in Travel, an immensely popular, somewhat freeform compendium of poetry, thoughts on science and philosophy. Published posthumously, the work became a staple of both scientific and family libraries for several decades afterward. Davy spent the winter in Rome, hunting in the Campagna on his fiftieth birthday. But on 20 February 1829 he had another stroke. After spending many months attempting to recuperate, Davy died in a room at L'Hotel de la Couronne, in the Rue du Rhone, in Geneva, Switzerland, on 29 May 1829. He had wished to be buried where he died, but had also wanted the burial delayed in case he was only comatose. He refused to allow a post-mortem for similar reasons. But the laws of Geneva did not allow any delay and he was given a public funeral on the following Monday, 1 June, in the Plainpalais Cemetery, outside the city walls.

Honours

Geographical locations
Shortly after his funeral, his wife organised a memorial tablet for him in Westminster Abbey at a cost of £142.
In 1872, a statue of Davy was erected in front of the Market Building, Penzance, (now owned by Lloyds TSB) at the top of Market Jew Street, Penzance.
A commemorative slate plaque on 4 Market Jew Street, Penzance, claims the location as his birthplace. a secondary school in Coombe Road, Penzance, is named Humphry Davy School. 
A pub at 32 Alverton Street, Penzance, is named "The Sir Humphry Davy".
One of the science buildings of the University of Plymouth is named The Davy Building.
There is a road named Humphry Davy Way adjacent to the docks in Bristol.
Outside the entrance to Sunderland Football Club's Stadium of Light stands a giant Davy Lamp, in recognition of local mining heritage and the importance of Davy's safety lamp to the mining industry.
There is a street named Humphry-Davy-Straße in the industrial quarter of the town of Cuxhaven, Schleswig-Holstein, Germany.
A satellite of the University of Sheffield at Golden Smithies Lane in Wath upon Dearne (Manvers) was called Humphry Davy House and was home to the School of Nursing and Midwifery until April 2009.
Davy Sound in Greenland was named in his honour by William Scoresby (1789–1857).
There is a 'zone of activity' commercial area in La Grand Combe, Gard, France, a former mining town, named after Davy.
Mount Davy in New Zealand's Paparoa Range was named after him by Julius von Haast.

Scientific and literary recognition
in 1827, the mineral davyne was named in his honour by W. Haidinger.
Annually since 1877, the Royal Society of London has awarded the Davy Medal "for an outstandingly important recent discovery in any branch of chemistry."
The Davy lunar crater is named after him. It has a diameter of 34 km and its coordinates are 11.8S, 8.1W.
Davy's passion for fly-fishing earned him the informal title "the father of modern fly-fishing", and his book Salmonia is often considered to be "the fly-fisherman bible".
The poet Samuel Taylor Coleridge said he "attended Davy's lectures to enlarge my stock of metaphors".

In popular culture
Novels and poetry
Davy is the subject of a humorous song by Richard Gendall, recorded in 1980 by folk-singer Brenda Wootton in the album Boy Jan Cornishman, the seven verses of which each recall a day of the week on which Davy purportedly made a particular discovery.
English playwright Nick Darke wrote Laughing Gas (2005) a comedy script about the life of Sir Humphry Davy, unfinished at the time of Nick Darke's death; completed posthumously by actor and playwright Carl Grose and produced by the Truro-based production company O-region.
Edmund Clerihew Bentley's first clerihew, published in 1905, was written about Sir Humphry Davy:
Sir Humphry Davy
Abominated gravy.
He lived in the odium
Of having discovered sodium.
 There is a humorous rhyme of unknown origin about the statue in Penzance: 
Sir Humphrey Davy's kindly face, 
Is turned away from Market Place
Towards St Michael's Mount
So, if he do want to tell the time
He've got to wait till the clock do chime 
Then he's forced to count.
Jules Verne refers to Davy's geological theories in his 1864 novel Journey to the Centre of the Earth

Publications
See Fullmer's work for a full list of Davy's articles.

Humphry Davy's books are as follows:
 

 (on Davy's safety lamp)

Davy also contributed articles on chemistry to Rees's Cyclopædia, but the topics are not known.

His collected works were published in 1839–1840:

See also
 List of presidents of the Royal Society

References

Bibliography

Sources

Primary sources

External links

 (Davy's first name is spelled incorrectly in this book.)
 
 
The Collected Works of Humphry Davy
Journal of a Tour made in the years 1828, 1829, through Styria, Carniola, and Italy, whilst accompanying the late Sir Humphry Davy by J. J. Tobin (1832)
Humphry Davy, Poet and Philosopher by Thomas Edward Thorpe, New York: Macmillan, 1896
Young Humphry Davy: The Making of an Experimental Chemist by June Z. Fullmer, Philadelphia: American Philosophical Society, 2000

 

1778 births
1829 deaths
Baronets in the Baronetage of the United Kingdom
18th-century English chemists
19th-century British inventors
British deists
Discoverers of chemical elements
Fellows of the American Academy of Arts and Sciences
Fellows of the Royal Society
Fellows of the Zoological Society of London
People educated at Truro Cathedral School
People from Penzance
People of the Industrial Revolution
People associated with electricity
Presidents of the Royal Society
Recipients of the Copley Medal
Royal Medal winners
Members of the Royal Swedish Academy of Sciences
18th-century English writers
18th-century English male writers
18th-century English poets
19th-century British chemists
19th-century English writers
Poets from Cornwall
Scientists from Cornwall
Burials at Cimetière des Rois
Calcium
Sodium
Potassium
Magnesium
Barium
Boron
Humphry
19th-century agronomists